The Superior Court of California, County of Humboldt, also known as the Humboldt County Superior Court or  Humboldt Superior Court, is the branch of the California superior court with jurisdiction over Humboldt County.

History

Humboldt County was formed in 1853 from parts of Trinity County. The city of Eureka is the county seat.

The first purpose-built county courthouse was completed in Eureka in 1889 at the corner of 3rd Street and G Street, and survived a fire in 1924.

The design was credited to architect J.M. Curtis.  It was condemned and demolished in 1956. The current courthouse was built in 1956 along with a new jail on the block encompassed by 4th, 5th, I and J Streets. In 1994 and 1995, a new jail was built as an addition on courthouse covering J Street. In 1995, the Humboldt County District Attorney's Office moved into the remodeled old jail.

References

External links
 

Superior Court
Superior courts in California